The Wainui River is a river of the Bay of Plenty Region of New Zealand's North Island. The catchment has  of stream margins. 41% of the catchment remains covered in native bush, but 48% is under pasture and suffers soil erosion.

Downstream, a 3-span  bridge takes SH2 over the river.

See also
List of rivers of New Zealand

References

External links 
 Photo of train on Wainui viaduct

Rivers of the Bay of Plenty Region
Rivers of New Zealand